Neil William "Woody" Houston (born January 19, 1957) is a Canadian curler.

He played at the 1988 Winter Olympics when curling was a demonstration sport, Canadian men's team won bronze medal.

During the early 1990s, Houston worked in sports facility management in Leduc, Whitecourt and Fort Saskatchewan. In 1995, Houston moved to Ottawa where he worked for the Canadian Curling Association as director of domestic development. After 13 years with the CCA, Houston moved to British Columbia in 2007 to become venue and sport manager for Curling at the 2010 Winter Olympics.

Houston coached the Andrew Bilesky rink at the 2013 Tim Hortons Brier.

Personal life
Houston is married to Bev Bakka, and has two children.

Awards
Canadian Curling Hall of Fame: inducted in 1992 with all Ed Lukowich 1986 team.

Teams

References

External links

Neil Houston – Curling Canada Stats Archive
Neil Houston Gallery | The Trading Card Database

 Video: 
 Audio: Curling Legends Podcast: Episode 5 - Neil Houston

Living people
1957 births
Curlers from Calgary
Canadian male curlers
Brier champions
Curlers at the 1988 Winter Olympics
Olympic curlers of Canada
Curlers from Ottawa
Curlers from British Columbia
Canadian curling coaches
World curling champions